Diamond Cut Audio Restoration Tools (also known as DC-Art and Diamond Cut Audio Lab) is a set of digital audio editor tools from Diamond Cut Productions used for audio restoration, record restoration, sound restoration of gramophone records and other audio containing media.

Origins
Diamond Cut Audio Restoration Tools (DC-Art) was originally a private venture by R&D engineer Craig Maier and software engineer Rick Carlson.  Developed in the early 1990s, the original concept was conceived in an attempt to preserve the extensive Edison Lateral collection of test pressing recordings held at the Edison National Historic Site in West Orange, New Jersey. DC-Art was developed so that the many test pressings could be transferred to digital tape for preservation and archival purposes.  The total number of songs which were recorded with the original software numbered over 1200 in anywhere from two to five takes and included many recordings that had not been played since the late 1920s.

In 1995, the Diamond Cut Audio Restoration Tools (DC-Art) program was first formally introduced into the commercial marketplace. Since then DC-Art (or DC for short) has been used throughout the world for not only musical audio restoration applications, but for others such as 911 call restoration, clarification of police surveillance recordings, cleanup of radio broadcasts for release on CD, restoration of historic spoken word recordings, cockpit voice recording restoration among others.  The full version is highly useful and flexible for any number of audio related operations.

Versions
Unlike other programs in the field of record and audio restoration, DC-Art has undergone regular and significant modifications on an almost annual basis.  Many of the changes appear to stem from the frequent discussions and interest in the process of audio restoration by addressing them using new and novel algorithms in order to both simplify and improve the outcomes of the audio restoration process.  As such, many of the releases include alterations aimed at both novice and experienced/expert users or engineers in the field:

DC-Art
DC-Art was the first of the officially released audio restoration programs from Diamond Cut Productions in April 1995 and featured a 16-bit processing architecture for the various audio processing algorithms. Initially it was released as a beta version to potential customers and identified as QA 1.1. During the initial release it took several months of de-bugging to optimise the various algorithms. DC-Art V1.0 was made available to the public by July 1996 and later through Tracer Technologies, Inc. in order to facilitate the marketing and distribution of the software. Version 2.0 of DC-Art was released later in December 1997 and included innovative real-time filter previews. If you have an original copy of QA 1.1, consider it a collectable antique!

DC-Art-32
DC-Art 32 was released in 1998 and also referred to as "DC-Art Version 3.0".  In contrast to the earlier release, DC-Art 32 used a 32-bit processing architecture to improve the accuracy of the various audio processing algorithms.  Unlike other audio-restoration software, DC-Art 32 also introduced a novel enhancement processes termed the Virtual Valve Amplifier (aka. VVA).  This novel enhancement algorithm provided the opportunity to re-create or enhance various harmonic frequencies that are otherwise lost during the audio restoration process and to "color" sound to match that of the era from which the recording was made.

DC-Art Millennium
DC-Art Millennium/Live or "DC-Art Version 4.0" was publicly released in August 1999. Unlike previous versions, DC-Art Millennium brought with it a new level of performance and features in the audio restoration and enhancement software market. Unlike other software of its type it included features like live feed-through mode whereby a user could effectively restore a recording on the fly.  At the time, it was also one of a few programs available to the public that supported 24-bit/96 kHz sound files which was later found to facilitate impulse noise detection and FFT-based noise removal algorithms.  In addition, DC-Art Millennium boasted over 15 real-time tools that could be used individually or in combination (called a multi-filter) and thus setting the restoration software benchmark for its time.

In August 2001, DC-Art Live and Millennium were up-dated to version 4.8 with various bug fixes and the addition of a digital high resolution VU meter. Also during this period, changes were made to improve the frequency resolution of the spectrum analyzer.

DC-Enhance/MP3
DC-Enhance/MP3 was released in February 2001 as a low cost product for improving the fidelity of  MP3 audio files.  Unlike other members of the DC-Art family DC-Enhance/MP3 did not include any tools for audio restoration, rather focusing on enhancement of bass and harmonic attributes of already digitised audio.  Due to the limited function of this program it was rapidly superseded by other DC-Art versions which included MP3 enhancement as a part of the multifilter component.

DC-Audio Mentor
As the name suggests, Audio Mentor was designed to take novice users "by the hand" and guide them through the restoration process of removing clicks, pops, hiss and surface noise from any recording format.  In a rather innovative method, Audio Mentor took a user through a series of informative steps from setting the recording levels, noise reduction, sound enhancement to making a CD in minutes.  It included facilities to automatically split a file into its individual tracks such as when transcribed from a cassette or LP record.  In addition, it simplified the process of tracking audio files undergoing or having undergone the restoration process by automatically transferring them between various folders and included a novel mechanism for keeping track of what had been done on each individual file (e.g. noise reduction, Enhancement, Final Touches).  DC-Audio Mentor underwent several months of beta testing before being released in mid July 2006.

DC-5
DC-5 beta began development in early 2000.  As the result of a substantial number of improvements, testing did not commence until June 2002 before being released in September 2002.  Previous versions of DC-Art software used a source vs destination file setup termed "Classic edit mode" whereby each time a filter was applied to a source file it would generate a new, altered destination file tiled within the same window.  Whilst this was commendable for archival purposes, for the home user or intermediate expert it resulted in too many semi-complete restoration files.  DC-5 addressed this issue by introducing "Fast Edit" mode and a new "Fast Edit" history whereby each change to the original file could be reversed.  In this mode, both the source and destination files became the one file on screen, whilst information regarding changes made were saved in the background to enable them to be selectively un-done.

Other improvements included VOX recording facilities, timer recording, dithering, 192 kHz sampling rate support and most importantly a "Live Feed-through mode" was added which enabled a multifilter to perform a record restoration on the fly often required for radio broadcasting.  Changes were also made to the functionality of the continuous noise filter whereby new inflexion points could be added to better match the FFT filter curve to that of the sampled noise in order to facilitate its removal without producing digital artifacts.

Other improvements were aimed at novice users or reducing the time required to restore recordings made from old shellac records.  These included new and simplified EZ DeClick and EZ DeCrackle filters for repairing unwanted impulse noises.  Similarly, a weighting function was added to the median filter which had advantages for both de-crackling a recording and facilitating speech clarification by changing the "timbre" of the sound often required with forensic audio recordings.  Other additions included a de-clipping filter and acoustical analysis facilities for spectrograph-voice prints.

DC-6
DC-6 Beta testing began May 2004 and was released in late August 2004.  This period saw a significant change to how the various software algorithms were being performed and resulted in increased speed of filter processing (reportedly anywhere from 25 to 100% faster). During this period, there were also a number of simplified filter designs added to aid novice users with the basics of record restoration.  This included the introduction of an EZClean filter that de-clicked, de-hissed and removed residual hum from a record in one step.

Similarly, the Live/Forensic edition saw a number of additional improvements relating to forensics work.  This included dual logging of incoming un-processed and out-going processed audio streams, time domain and frequency domain adaptive filter algorithms for separating human voice from significant background noise.  It is also possible that DC-6 was the first to boast a new “Auto-continuous noise” FFT algorithm that would automatically calculate the noise fingerprint of a recording “on the fly” and update it on a continuous basis.  Whilst this method was deemed not as effective for removing noise compared to the other traditional techniques, the convenience it provided to novice or time-restricted users and the additional ability to adapt to changing noise environments outweighed the noise reduction performance limitations.

AFDF/VVA VST plugin
In 2006 several of the audio enhancement tools previously only available in the DC-Art line were trialed and released as VST plugin devices for use in other VST plugin compatible audio software. These plugins included a suite of powerful digital signal processing (DSP) audio tools including the Automatic Frequency Domain Filter (AFDF) as well as the Virtual Valve Amplifier (VVA). These tools were readily welcomed especially the AFDF due to its ability to automatically adapt itself to noisy files and remove large amounts of noise with little intervention from the user. The AFDF filter found its application in situations where voice recordings were obscured by noise and needed to separated from cacophonous environmental sounds in order to make them audible and understandable. This was primarily because it was designed as an “Adaptive” filter that constantly changed during operation, adjusting itself to the noisy environment.  Unlike other filters offered in the DC-Art range, the AFDF is optimized for Forensics recordings and not “High Fidelity” files. As such, it was programmed to exhibit a faster response time and a narrower effective bandwidth while producing higher levels of noise reduction at the expense of potentially producing higher levels of digital artifacts.  Applications included recordings collected by law enforcement officials and others responsible for cleaning up poorly recorded evidence in a short time for accurate presentation at trials.

DC-7
DC-7 began beta testing in July 2007 and was later released in October 2007.  It boasted a significantly different algorithm included into the FFT-based continuous noise filter called "Artifact Suppression" mode.  The new algorithm reportedly reduced the aliasing and artifacting that often accompanies noise reduction with such filters.  Of equal significance was the introduction of a simple Virtual Phono Preamp for accurate and simplified equalization of almost any record format.  Another milestone was the development and inclusion of an "EZ Enhancer" filter which simplified the otherwise difficult process of sound enhancement that often follows the noise reduction process.  DC-7 also introduced a simple "Tune Library" which allowed a user to catalogue the progression and restoration of audio files in a database style view.  Somewhere along the line it was also decided to include the Spectrogram View previously only found in the DC-Forensics range with the basic audio restoration/Live software version to aid in manual impulse noise removal and other challenging operations.  Together, these changes provided very successful and popular in the field of audio restoration tools and was likened to the transition "from regular television to High Definition".

DC7.5
DC-7 was further evolved to DC-7.5 which was released for beta testing in November 2008.  It included a number of improvements namely the addition of a narrow crackle filter for smoothing the sound of recordings made on old shellac records. Other modifications included better discrimination of impulse noise filters in the presence of Brass/voice solos and the FFT-based continuous noise filter which was also modified to include a larger range of FFT filter sizes (from 32 to 1600+ frequency bins).  Similarly, a number of other restorations were updated and improved before being made available to the public in January 2009.

DC-8
DC-8 is the latest of the Diamond Cut Audio Restoration Software releases.  DC8 was released for private beta testing in late November 2009. Due to a number of significant changes to the core of the program, rigorous beta testing took several months delaying the final release to March 2010.  DC8 included a number of novel and innovative advances including a "Big Click Filter" for automatically repairing extremely large clicks created by a cracked or badly gouged record. DC8 also introduced the concept of a Direct Spectral Editor tool to provide users with the ability to manually attenuate or interpolate very long-lived noise events on recordings like coughs, whistling, chair movement and other unwanted spurious signals. In addition, the spectral editing tool has other uses in audio restoration including the selective removal of record “swoosh” sounds that are otherwise unable to be removed without significant audio fidelity degradation. The DSE tool has been discontinued in the United States versions, but is available elsewhere throughout the world.

Other improvements included changes to the performance of the manual impulse noise interpolator through the use of a combination of time and frequency domain techniques.  DC8 also included file support for Broadcast Wave Formats (BWF), Flac, and Ogg Vorbis. The Virtual Phono Preamplifier was also expanded to include 49 additional LP EQ recording curves usable with either RIAA or Flat Preamp front-end hardware.  Of the novel additions was the inclusion of the “Sub-Harmonic Synthesizer” and the “Overtone Synthesizer”. These two filters generate harmonic frequencies to re-create the lost lower and upper octaves of a recording improving the fidelity of a restoration.

See also
 List of music software

References

External links

Acoustics software